Lawrence M. Gama (19 January 1935 – 16 December 2009) was a Tanzanian CCM politician and Member of Parliament for Songea constituency from 1995 to 2005. He was the Head of the Nation Building Army (JKT) and Head of the Department of National Security (TISS).

References

1935 births
2009 deaths
Chama Cha Mapinduzi MPs
Tanzanian MPs 2000–2005
Ndanda Secondary School alumni
Humboldt University of Berlin alumni